Mount Terry Fox is a peak in the Selwyn Range of the Canadian Rockies in British Columbia, Canada. In 1981, the previously unnamed mountain was named in honour of Terry Fox.

References

Terry Fox
Terry Fox
Terry Fox
Cariboo Land District